Donut Media is an American automotive content brand, known primarily for its eponymous YouTube channel and online merchandise store.

History 

Donut Media was founded in 2015 by Matt Levin, a former product head at AwesomenessTV, Ben Conrad and Nick Moceri. The channel's first video was about the 24 Hours of LeMons. It achieved early viral success with its 2016 video Two Grannies, One Lamborghini, which for many years was the channel's most-viewed video.

In February 2016, Up to Speed "debuted" with a video describing nine must-know facts about the Nissan 240SX. The official Up to Speed show debuted in July 2017 with a video talking about the Nissan Skyline.

In February 2018, Donut Media tried to re-create the Elon Musk's Tesla Roadster stunt by sending a Hot Wheels Tesla Roadster car into space.

In May 2018, Donut Media received $800,000 in seed funding in a round led by Techstars Ventures. In November of that year, it partnered with NASCAR to offer lighthearted racing-related content.

Between 2018 and 2020, the channel saw breakout success due to its "Up To Speed" series. In the series, host James Pumphrey explains the origins of automotive models, brands, and other car related items with cult followings such as the Nissan GT-R, Plymouth Barracuda, and Suzuki Samurai. According to Levin, "Up To Speed" marked the moment Donut Media moved from dependence on viral one-offs to having a sustainable content model.

In November 2020, Donut Media contributed with Codemasters for its new Dirt 5 game, with hosts James Pumphrey and Nolan Sykes discussing all things in the Dirt Off-Road Series world with the Dirt Podcast.

In January 2021, Donut Media released a song called "Pop-Up Up and Down Headlights." A shirt based on this song was also released on Donut's online merchandise store. A mint version of this shirt was released and a white version of it was also released.  This song was the full version of a song of the same name that was featured in various Up to Speed episodes talking about cars with pop-up headlights.

In June 2021, Donut Media released a Kickstarter project called Stocky which is a series of collectable toy cars based on real cars, but the Stocky toys have cartoonish proportions, similar to Hot Wheels' Tooned line of toy cars. Stocky first debuted on Donut's channel on their Up to Speed video about Type R. The first Stocky ever made was an Acura Integra Type R.

On November 9, 2021, Donut Media was acquired by Recurrent, a digital media company which also owns The Drive and Car Bibles automotive lifestyle brands.

Awards and nominations

Current Shows

Wheelhouse 
Uploaded every Monday, Wheelhouse is a show which covers various topics that are related to automobiles, and sometimes talks about recent automotive news. This show is hosted by Nolan Sykes.

Bumper 2 Bumper 
Uploaded every Tuesday, Bumper 2 Bumper (also known as "B2B") is a show that goes into detail about the engineering and technology of various cars and other technical automotive topics. The current B2B is similar to Science Garage, which is another Donut Media show. This show is hosted by Jeremiah Burton. Previously hosted by multiple hosts (most notably James Pumphrey), Bumper 2 Bumper was a show that covered the details of famous and well-known cars. The show was later transferred to Jeremiah, and due to the COVID-19 pandemic, the format was changed to technical automotive topics.

Money Pit 
Uploaded every other Wednesday, Money Pit is a show where Zach Jobe (host) adds upgrades and modifications to his Mazda Miata or more recently, a BMW 3 Series, and also has DIY tutorials for working on project cars. The Mazda Miata's modification focuses mainly on trackable daily use, and the BMW 3 Series's modification focuses on rallying.

Up to Speed 
Up to Speed is a show that goes into detail about the history of various cars, brands, and other car-related items, with humor in most episodes. It goes into detail about why they were created, how they were used, and how they came to be. This show is hosted by James Pumphrey. His extreme passion about cars and the automotive world shines through in this segment. Up to Speed "debuted" in 2016 when Donut uploaded a video on 9 facts about the Nissan 240SX. Many people regard this video as the "first" episode of Up to Speed. This was just a pre-debut video. The real Up to Speed show debuted in 2017 with a video talking about the Nissan Skyline.

D-List 
Uploaded every Friday, D-List is a show that covers certain types of cars and other car-related topics in a list-style format. This show is hosted by James Pumphrey. Sometimes, other Donut hosts or non-Donut guests host the show with James.

HiLow 
Uploaded every Sunday, James Pumphrey and Nolan Sykes (the main hosts of the show) purchased nearly identical vehicles and modified them to be fun daily drivers that you could take you the track, with either cheap or expensive parts. For "Hi" car, which is James' team's car, they modified their Nissan 350Z with expensive parts. For "Low" car, which is Nolan's team's car, they modified their Nissan 350Z with cheap parts. They changed the following parts: Suspension, Wheels & Tires, Brakes, Differentials, Color, Seats, Fuel Injectors, and Radiators. Along with adding; Turbo kits, Roll cage, Body kits, and Lighting kits. They then tested the Nissans out on the track to see if more money spent meant a better resulting product. Both the Nissan 350Zs ended the track day in a disarray, "Low" car having an engine failure, and "Hi" Car getting black flagged on the track for blowing a lot of smoke out of the exhaust. A few years later Donut Media returned to the Nissan 350Zs for a change of direction. Before, the purpose of the Nissan 350Zs was to have a fun daily driver that you could take to the track, after Donut brought back the cars, they switched gears to, fun daily drivers that you can go drifting in. They added onto the cars with the following parts: Drift suspension kits, and a hydraulic e-brake. And to make the cars run again, they swapped the motors with V8s. In the time between the first 16 episodes and the final 3 of the Nissan 350Z, they chose to build pick-up trucks to go over landing in. Donut Media chose to build off of the Toyota Tacoma platform. For "Hi" truck, which is James' team's truck, they modified their Toyota Tacoma with expensive parts. For "Low" truck, which is Nolan's team's car, they modified their Toyota Tacoma with cheap parts. They changed the following: Suspension, Wheels & Tires, Armor, Lockers, Recovery Gear, Lights, and a Roof-top tent. They then tested the Toyotas out on a trail to see if more money spent meant a better resulting product. The only major issue on the trip was "Hi" truck accidentally pulling its own front bumper off due to user error while winching up a steep rock face. For the first season they used Nissan 350Zs back in 2019 and 2020, and in 2021 the show featured Toyota Tacomas. In 2022, the 350Zs were brought back for the final 3 episodes of the show.

Past Gas 
Uploaded every Sunday (alongside HiLow) on Donut Media's secondary channel, Donut Podcasts, Past Gas is a podcast that talks about important and significant events in automotive history. This podcast is hosted by Nolan John Sykes, James Pumphrey, and Joe Weber. Past Gas can also be watched on various podcast apps.

Tool Party 
Uploaded every Wednesday, Tool Party is a series where tools of different price ranges (or occasionally As Seen On TV tools) are tested to their absolute limits. Tool Party debuted in 2022 when Donut uploaded a video where they test different impact wrenches of different price ranges. The series is primarily sponsored by eBay Motors.

Discontinued Shows

Science Garage 
Science Garage was hosted by Bart Bidlingmeyer from February 2017 to January 2019, Bart left Donut in April 2019 to work for Kelley Blue Book and Motor Trend. Each episode of the show covered a specific automobile part or mechanism in great detail and included the science behind it. The show contributed to Donut Media's early popularity. The current iteration of Bumper 2 Bumper is an unofficial "sequel" to Science Garage.

Miracle Whips 
Miracle Whips was hosted by Byron Bowers from June 2018 to October 2018. The purpose of the show was to find Byron his "Miracle Whip", which he defines as a car that someone would be comfortable owning and driving every day for the rest of their life. The show ends when Byron chooses his Miracle Whip in the last episode, a Nissan GTR R35. At the end of the last episode, he hints at a second season coming soon, however there have been no updates since.

Car Wars 
...

The New Car Show 
...

Car Boys 
...

References

External links
 Donut Media Store
 Donut Media YouTube Channel
 Donut Podcasts YouTube Channel

YouTube channels